is a 2008 Japanese comedy-drama film written and directed by Sion Sono. The film gained a considerable amount of notoriety in film festivals around the world for its four-hour runtime and themes including love, family, lust, religion and the crime of upskirt photography. The first version was originally six hours long, but was trimmed at the request of the producers.

Following its release, it won many awards and received acclaim from critics. At the Berlin International Film Festival, it won the Caligari Film Award and the FIPRESCI Prize.

Plot
Yū Honda is a young teenager Catholic attempting to live his life faithfully. His father, Tetsu, has become a devout Catholic priest following the death of Yū's mother and operates his own church. Tetsu asks Yū to confess his sins, but Yū believes he is a good person who has little to confess. To appease his father, he makes up sins but his father sees right through him so Yū becomes obsessed with committing real sins. Yū befriends other boys and is taught to steal, fight, and take stealth photographs up women's skirts. Yū promptly becomes a skilled "panty shot" photographer. Though perceived as a pervert, he is never aroused by these photographs.

After Yū loses a bet with his friends, he agrees to go into the city dressed as a woman and kiss a girl he likes. When they go into the city, Yū and his friends come across Yōko, his "Virgin Mary" who is surrounded by a group of thugs. Still dressed as a woman, he helps Yōko, a skilled fighter herself, beat up the gang. Afterwards he kisses Yōko and runs away. Yū falls in love with her – the first time he's been in love with a girl - but Yōko falls for his disguise and develops feelings for his alter ego Sasori, or "Miss Scorpion".

Meanwhile, Yū is being followed by Aya Koike, a member of the cult "Zero Church", who has become infatuated with him after she catches him taking a picture of her panties. Aya, who turned violent after being sexually abused to the point of insanity, plans to bring Yū's entire family into the Zero Church and masquerades as Sasori to gain Yōko's favor.

Aya manipulates those around Yū and Yōko and Yū's family become caught up in the Zero Church. Yū desperately tries to free Yōko from the cult by kidnapping her but fails to persuade her to leave as she does not trust him to be Miss Scorpion and is convinced he is a pervert. Armed with a sword, Yū breaks into the Zero Church's building and again tries to escape with Yōko. Aya, who is present along with Yū's family, fights back, but commits suicide by driving the sword through her stomach when she realizes Yū's love for Yōko.

Yū is taken to a mental hospital, where he has forgotten all of his past and convinced himself that he is really Sasori. Yōko comes to visit, claiming that she now realises that she loves him as he was the one always trying to save her. Yū cannot remember who she is, so security escort the hysterical Yōko out of the building. Moments later, Yū remembers her and escapes from the hospital, running after the car driving Yōko away. Yū catches up, smashes open the car window, and joins hands with Yōko.

Cast
 Takahiro Nishijima as Yū Honda
 Hikari Mitsushima as Yōko Ozawa
 Sakura Ando as Aya Koike
 Makiko Watanabe as Kaori Fujiwara
 Atsuro Watabe as Tetsu Honda

Reception
On review aggregator Rotten Tomatoes, Love Exposure holds an approval rating of 91% based on 22 reviews, with an average rating of 7.74/10. The website's critical consensus reads: "An engagingly funny melodrama as well as an ambitious exploration of sexual behavior, Sion Sono's Love Exposure provides nearly four hours of extremely strange and entertaining cinema." On Metacritic, the film has a weighted average score of 78 out of 100 based on 11 reviews, indicating "generally favorable reviews".

Jaime Grijalba of Brooklyn Magazine wrote that "nothing can prepare anyone for the madness of this profound work of love, perversion, religion, friendship and conspiracies. It’s the most bombastic work of Japanese Cinema of the past decade and maybe the only four-hour film you can watch more than three times[...] in a year." In 2015, Jasper Sharp of the British Film Institute listed it as one of the 10 great Japanese films of the 21st century. Freelance film critic Kenji Fujishima also voted Love Exposure the ninth greatest film of the century in BBC's 2016 poll.

Awards
The film received the following awards and nominations:

References

External links
 

2000s romantic comedy-drama films
2008 films
2008 action thriller films
Cross-dressing in film
Films directed by Sion Sono
Films set in Japan
Films shot in Tokyo
Japanese independent films
Japanese LGBT-related films
Films set in religious buildings and structures
2008 independent films
2000s Japanese films
2000s Japanese-language films